Franklin Electronic Publishers, Incorporated (formerly Franklin Computer Corporation) is an American consumer electronics manufacturer based in Burlington, New Jersey, founded in 1981. Since the mid-1980s, it has primarily created and sold hand-held electronic references, such as spelling correctors, dictionaries, translation devices, medical references, and Bibles. It was publicly traded on the American Stock Exchange under the symbol FEP until September 30, 2009, when it merged with Saunders Acquisition Corporation.

Early history
Franklin was founded in 1981 by Barry Borden, Russell Bower, and Joel Shusterman as Franklin Computer Corporation. It manufactured clones of the Apple II series computer, which it first marketed in 1982.

In early 1982, Franklin released the Franklin ACE 100, and in March of the same year, the Franklin ACE 1000; they were very close copies of the Apple II and Apple II Plus computers, respectively. The motherboard design is nearly identical and Franklin also copied Apple's ROMs. Two months later, Apple Computer sued Franklin for copyright violation. Franklin initially won, but ultimately lost. (See Apple Computer, Inc. v. Franklin Computer Corp..)

Franklin followed with the ACE 1200, which included two built-in 5¼" floppy drives and an ACE 80 Zilog Z80 processor card (a rebranded PCPI Appli-Card) for CP/M compatibility—a popular third-party option for the Apple II. The ACE 1200 was identical to the ACE 1000, but with the addition of dual built-in floppy drives and four expansion cards pre-installed (one of which offered color video; the ACE 1000 was monochrome). At its peak workforce in 1983, Franklin employed 450 employees.

In August 1983, a court ruled against Franklin, which had argued that because computer code generally did not exist in printed form, it could not be copyrighted. Franklin freely admitted it had copied Apple's ROM and operating system code. However, Franklin was able to get an injunction that allowed it to continue marketing its computers. This case had lasting implications, setting precedent for copyright and reverse engineering. The case was still frequently cited more than 30 years after the August 1983 ruling.

In June 1984, Franklin filed for reorganization under Chapter 11 of the Federal Bankruptcy Act. Franklin reduced its workforce to just over 100, from a previous total of 275 employees. Franklin had been planning to release the Franklin CX, a portable Apple II clone, but this release was cancelled due to the bankruptcy.

Starting in October 1985, Franklin released a second-generation line of Apple II clones, consisting of the ACE 2000 series (based on the Apple IIe) and ACE 500 (based on the Apple IIc). These included more memory, as well as offering many features unique to the Apple IIe and Apple IIc, all while undercutting Apple's price. The ACE 2200 sported a detached keyboard and dual internal 5.25-inch floppy disk drives.

Franklin also released a pair of IBM PC compatible computers, the Franklin PC6000 and PC8000, during 1986–1988. Both were based on the Intel 8088 running at 4.77 MHz. The PC6000 had 512K of RAM and a single floppy drive, while the PC8000 had 640K and dual drives. These matched the most common configurations of the time.

Soon after the ACE 2200's release, Apple was able to force Franklin out of the desktop computer market entirely, including its IBM-compatible PCs. As a result, the only Apple-compatible computer that remained on the market was VTech's Laser 128.

With the loss of its desktop computer business, Franklin concentrated on its handheld line, which it had introduced in 1986.

In 1987, Franklin released the Spelling Ace, which could provide spelling corrections to 80,000 English words based on technology from Proximity Technology.  Franklin also released its Language Master device, which included spelling correction, dictionary definitions and a thesaurus. In 1988, Franklin acquired Proximity Technology.  In 1989, Franklin released an electronic version of the Bible in the King James, Revised Standard and New International versions. Johnny Cash was a spokesperson for the company,
 recording Bible passages for their line of electronic Bibles.

In 1995, Franklin launched its Bookman product line, which came with an installed database and included a slot for plugging in a second electronic book. Prices varied depending on the title. Previously, the Digital Book System (DBS) product was a player only, with two slots for electronic book cards. Franklin collaborated with Bien Logic to create educational titles for the Bookman platform.

Products
Currently FEP makes electronic versions of dictionaries, translators, tutors, puzzles, Bibles, Rolodex organizers, calculators, and books.

PDA
In the past, it also made the Rex line of personal digital assistants, such as the REX 5000. That product line was later sold to Xircom.

Language products
The company marketed its first handheld reference device, the Spelling Ace spelling corrector, in 1986.

The company also designs and licenses linguistic software to third party software application providers through its Proximity Technology Division.

The company's first product for the Asian market, the Japanese-English Electronic PageMark Dictionary, was distributed through its partner Seiko Instruments, Inc.

eBook
The eBook products are sold in BOOKMAN Book Card, digital download (Franklin Reader, Mobipocket Reader, or other file formats) formats. They also made an eBook reader called eBookMan.

Outsourced R&D
Franklin Electronic Publishers outsourced all of its R&D to Hong Kong, with the last day of U.S. R&D operations being March 31, 2009.

See also
Bilingual dictionary
Apple Computer, Inc. v. Franklin Computer Corp.

References

External links
Franklin official home page
After the Franklin affair, Apple added a backdoor into their ROMs so that stolen Apple code could be detected
A timeline of Apple II products, including mention of compatible Franklin computer products
Another timeline of Apple II and competing products

Apple–Franklin Lawsuit Articles
A brief recap of the lawsuit
IMPACT OF APPLE VS. FRANKLIN DECISION By Rob Hassett
Refusal of Apple's injunction request
The Making of a Computer by Perry Greenberg

Product Articles
Franklin ACE 100
Franklin ACE 500
Franklin ACE 1000
Franklin ACE 1000
Franklin ACE 1000 museum piece
Franklin ACE 1200
Franklin ACE 2000, 2100, 2200
Franklin ACE 2100
Franklin PC-5000, PC-6000, PC-8000

Computer companies of the United States
Home computer hardware companies
Companies based in Burlington County, New Jersey
Apple II clones